I Heart You may refer to:

 "I Heart You" (Toni Braxton song), 2012
 "I Heart You" (SM*SH song), 2010
 I Heart You (album), a 2014 album by Daniel Padilla